Kung Fu Panda is a 2008 American computer-animated martial arts comedy film produced by DreamWorks Animation and distributed by Paramount Pictures. The first installment in the Kung Fu Panda franchise, it was directed by John Stevenson (in his feature directorial debut) and co-directed by Mark Osborne, from a screenplay by the writing team of Jonathan Aibel and Glenn Berger, and a story by Ethan Reiff and Cyrus Voris. The film stars the voices of Jack Black, Dustin Hoffman, Angelina Jolie, Ian McShane, Seth Rogen, Lucy Liu, David Cross, Randall Duk Kim, James Hong, Dan Fogler, Michael Clarke Duncan, and Jackie Chan. The film, set in a version of ancient China populated by anthropomorphic animals, centers on a bumbling panda named Po (Black), a kung-fu enthusiast. When a notorious snow-leopard named Tai Lung (McShane) is foretold to escape at Chorh-Gom Prison, Po is unwittingly named the "Dragon Warrior"—a prophesied hero worthy of reading a scroll said to grant its reader limitless power.

Publicized work on the film began in October 2004, with the project being officially announced in September 2005. The film was conceived by Michael Lachance, a DreamWorks Animation executive, originally as a parody of martial arts films. However, director Stevenson instead decided to make an action-comedy wuxia film that incorporates the hero's journey narrative archetype for the lead character, in which the computer animation, this time, was more complex than anything DreamWorks had done before. As with most DreamWorks Animation films, Hans Zimmer (this time collaborating with John Powell) scored Kung Fu Panda. Zimmer visited China to absorb the culture and got to know the China National Symphony Orchestra as part of his preparation.
  
Kung Fu Panda was theatrically released in the United States on June 6, 2008. The film received positive reviews for its animation, mature themes, humor, faithfulness to the Chinese environment and tradition, score, action sequences, writing, and voiceover performances; most consider it one of DreamWorks animation's best films. Kung Fu Panda opened in 4,114 theaters and grossed $20.3 million on its opening day and $60.2 million on its opening weekend, resulting in the number one position at the box office and becoming DreamWorks' biggest opening for a non-sequel film. By the end of its run, Kung Fu Panda had grossed $631.7 million on a budget of $130 million, making it the third highest-grossing film of 2008 and the highest-grossing animated film of the year worldwide, in addition to having the fourth-largest opening weekend for a DreamWorks film at the American and Canadian box office, behind the Shrek franchise. Kung Fu Panda was nominated for the Academy Award as well as a Golden Globe Award for Best Animated Film, but lost both awards to WALL-E. 

The success of Kung Fu Panda spawned a multimedia franchise with two sequels, with Kung Fu Panda 2 (2011) and Kung Fu Panda 3 (2016); a fourth film is in development with a 2024 release date.

Plot 

In the Valley of Peace, a land in Ancient China inhabited by anthropomorphic animals, Po, a clumsy giant panda, helps his adoptive father, a goose named Mr. Ping, run their noodle restaurant. Po dreams of fighting alongside the Furious Five – Masters Tigress, Monkey, Crane, Viper, and Mantis – a group of kung fu masters who live in the Jade Palace, where they are trained by Master Shifu, a cranky red panda. The wise tortoise Master Oogway predicts that Shifu's former snow leopard protégé, Tai Lung, will escape from prison and attack the valley to obtain the Dragon Scroll, a legendary artifact he had previously been denied. Panicked, Shifu sends a goose named Zeng to increase the security at Chorh-Gom Prison in Mongolia, where Tai Lung is held.

At the same time, Shifu holds a tournament for the Five so that Oogway can identify the Dragon Warrior, the prophesied hero worthy of reading the Scroll, which is said to grant limitless power to its reader. Po arrives too late to enter the arena; desperate to see his idols, he accidentally launches himself into the middle of the tournament, where Oogway proclaims him the Dragon Warrior. Believing Oogway's decision to be an accident, Shifu tries to dispose of Po with a harsh training regime, while the Five dismiss Po as an enthusiast with no potential in kung fu. Po considers quitting, but after receiving encouragement from Oogway, he endures his training and gradually befriends the Five with his resilience, culinary skill, and good humor.

During this time, Po learns that Shifu's cold and distant behavior stems from his own shame over Tai Lung's betrayal, having raised him from infancy. At Chorh-Gom Prison, Zeng's warnings are ignored, and Tai Lung escapes. Shifu informs Oogway of the event, with the tortoise making Shifu promise to believe in Po as the Dragon Warrior. Oogway then passes on to the heavens in a stream of peach blossoms. Upon hearing that Oogway has left and that Tai Lung is fast approaching, Po, still unable to make any progress with kung fu, makes Shifu admit that he does not know how to train the panda into the Dragon Warrior. Tigress overhears this and leads the Five in an  secret attempt to stop Tai Lung themselves. 

Meanwhile, Shifu discovers that Po is capable of impressive physical feats when motivated by food, and successfully trains Po by incorporating these feats into an innovative kung fu style. The Furious Five fight Tai Lung; however, all but Crane are soon defeated by his nerve-strike technique. Crane carries the paralyzed Five back to the Jade Palace, where Shifu revives them and decides that Po is ready to receive the Dragon Scroll. When Po reads it, he discovers that the scroll is nothing but a blank reflective surface. Despaired, Po and the Five evacuate the inhabitants of the Valley, while Shifu prepares to face Tai Lung alone. In trying to console a distraught Po, Mr. Ping reveals that his "secret ingredient soup" has no secret ingredient, explaining that things can become special with belief. 

Realizing that this is the message of the Dragon Scroll, Po rushes back to help Shifu. At the Jade Palace, Tai Lung overpowers Shifu and demands to know the location of the Scroll. Po arrives with the Dragon Scroll and challenges Tai Lung to combat. Tai Lung eventually wins, but also despairs over the blank scroll, and takes his anger out on Po. Discovering that his body fat renders him immune to Tai Lung's nerve strikes, Po trounces his adversary with his new kung fu style, and eventually banishes him to the Spirit Realm using the Wuxi Finger Hold technique. Po is honored by the Valley and gains the respect of the Furious Five. In a post-credits' scene, Shifu and Po share a meal while a peach that Shifu had planted earlier in the movie grows into a tree in the background.

Voice cast 

 Jack Black as Po, an energetic and accident-prone yet heroic giant panda and a die-hard kung-fu fan who eventually becomes The Dragon Warrior.
 Dustin Hoffman as Master Shifu, an elderly and strict red panda and kung-fu master to the Furious Five and Po and Tai Lung's old master/adopted father.
 Randall Duk Kim as Grand Master Oogway, an ancient Galápagos tortoise and Shifu's mentor.
 Ian McShane as Tai Lung, an arrogant and aggressive snow-leopard who was formerly Shifu's adoptive son and student.
 Riley Osborne as young Tai Lung.
 The Furious Five:
 Angelina Jolie as Master Tigress, a no-nonsense and tough-as-nails South China tigress and leader of the Furious Five.
 Seth Rogen as Master Mantis, a dry-humored Chinese mantis.
 Lucy Liu as Master Viper, a sweet and good-natured green tree-viper. Liu reprised her role in the Mandarin Chinese dubbing of the movie. 
 David Cross as Master Crane, a pragmatic and sarcastic red-crowned crane.
 Jackie Chan as Master Monkey, an easy-going golden snub-nosed monkey.
 James Hong as Mr. Ping, Po's adoptive father, a happy-go-lucky Chinese goose who runs a noodle-restaurant. 
 Dan Fogler as Zeng, a timid Chinese goose, and Shifu's messenger.
 Michael Clarke Duncan as Commander Vachir, a hubristic and boastful Javan rhinoceros who is the warden of Chorh-Gom Prison, where Tai Lung is imprisoned.

Kyle Gass and JR Reed voice KG Shaw and JR Shaw, respectively, two pigs who come across Po before the Dragon Warrior Tournament. Other actors with minor voice roles include Wayne Knight, Laura Kightlinger, and Kent Osborne. The film's directors, John Stevenson and Mark Osborne, also have small voice roles.

Production 

DreamWorks had previously produced the PlayStation video game with a similar premise, T'ai Fu: Wrath of the Tiger under its defunct video game division DreamWorks Interactive (now known as Danger Close Games). Publicized work on the film began in October 2004. In September 2005, DreamWorks Animation announced the film alongside Jack Black, who was selected to be the main voice star.

In November 2005, DreamWorks Animation announced that Dustin Hoffman, Jackie Chan, Lucy Liu and Ian McShane would join Jack Black in the cast. This is also the second DreamWorks Animation film in which Black and Angelina Jolie have co-starred together, the first being 2004's Shark Tale.

The idea for the film was conceived by Michael Lachance, a DreamWorks Animation executive. Initially, the idea was to make it a spoof, but co-director John Stevenson was not particularly keen on it and instead chose the direction of a character-based wuxia comedy.

Reportedly inspired by Stephen Chow's 2004 martial arts action comedy film, Kung Fu Hustle, the co-directors wanted to make sure the film also had an authentic Chinese and kung-fu feel to it. Production designer Raymond Zibach and art director Tang Heng spent years researching Chinese painting, sculpture, architecture and kung-fu films to help create the look of the film. Zibach said some of the biggest influences for him are the more artful martial arts films such as Hero, House of Flying Daggers and Crouching Tiger, Hidden Dragon. Stevenson's aim for the film, which took four years to make, was to make "the best looking film DreamWorks has ever made".

The hand-drawn animation sequence at the beginning of the film was made to resemble Chinese shadow puppetry. The opening, which was directed by Jennifer Yuh Nelson and produced by James Baxter, was praised by The New York Times reviewer Manohla Dargis as "striking" and "visually different from most mainstream American animations".

Other reviewers have compared the opening to the evocative style of Genndy Tartakovsky's Cartoon Network series Samurai Jack. The rest of the film is modern computer animation, which uses bright, offbeat colors to evoke the natural landscape of China. The end credit sequence also features hand-drawn characters and still paintings in the background.

The computer animation used throughout the film was more complex than anything DreamWorks had done before. When the head of the production handed the script to VFX Supervisor Markus Manninen, she reportedly laughed and wished him "good luck". "When we started talking," said Manninen, "the movie was still a high concept. But for everyone that looked at it, it screamed complexity. We launched off by saying, how can you make this movie tangible? How can you find smart ways to bring this world to life in a way that makes it a great movie and not feel like the complexity becomes the driver of the story, but the story and the emotion being the driver?" In preparation, the animators took a six-hour kung fu class.

Producer Melissa Cobb said that originally Po was "more of a jerk," but that the character changed after they heard Jack Black. According to Black, he mostly worked "in isolation", although he and Dustin Hoffman did spend a day together, which Cobb said helped with the scene where their characters face off. Lucy Liu said that the film "was quite different because it was such a long process." Liu said that when she was presented with the project they already had artwork of her character as well as a "short computerized video version of what she would look like when she moved."

Release

Theatrical 
The film held its world premiere at the 61st Cannes Film Festival on May 15, 2008, where it received massive and sustained applause at the end of the film's screening. Kung Fu Panda later had national premieres in IMAX in the US on June 1, 2008, at AMC & Regal Entertainment Group in Hollywood, Los Angeles, California, and on June 26, 2008, at Leicester Square in London, for the UK.

Home media 
Kung Fu Panda was released on DVD and Blu-ray on November 9, 2008, and on 3D Blu-ray on December 6, 2011, as a Best Buy exclusive. The DVD double pack release of Kung Fu Panda also includes a short animated film Secrets of the Furious Five. With 7,486,642 DVD units sold in 2008, Kung Fu Panda was the fourth highest-selling film and the first highest-selling animated film of 2008, right before WALL-E, which sold 7,413,548 units. As of February 2010, 17.4 million home entertainment units were sold worldwide.

Reception

Box office 
The film topped the box office in its opening weekend, grossing $60.2 million for a $14,642 average from 4,114 theaters and performing much better than analysts had been expecting. It also was the highest-grossing opening for a non-sequel DreamWorks Animation film at the time. In its second weekend, the film retreated 44% to second place behind The Incredible Hulk grossing $33.6 million for a $8,127 average from expanding to 4,136 theaters. It closed on October 9, 2008, after 125 days of release, grossing $215.4 million in the United States and Canada and $416.3 million overseas for a worldwide total of $631.7 million. Kung Fu Panda was the highest-grossing non-Shrek film from DreamWorks Animation in the United States and Canada before it was surpassed by How to Train Your Dragon in 2010.

Critical response 
The website's critical consensus reads, "Kung Fu Panda has a familiar message, but the pleasing mix of humor, swift martial arts action, and colorful animation makes for winning summer entertainment." Metacritic reported the film had an average score of 74 out of 100, based on 36 reviews. Audiences polled by CinemaScore gave the film an average grade of "A−" on an A+ to F scale.

Richard Corliss of Time Magazine gave Kung Fu Panda a positive review, stating the picture "provides a master course in cunning visual art and ultra-satisfying entertainment". The New York Times said, "At once fuzzy-wuzzy and industrial strength, the tacky-sounding Kung Fu Panda is high concept with a heart," and the review called the film "consistently diverting" and "visually arresting". Chris Barsanti of Filmcritic.com commented, "Blazing across the screen with eye-popping, sublime artwork, Kung Fu Panda sets itself apart from the modern domestic animation trend with its sheer beauty ... the film enters instant classic status as some of the most gorgeous animation Hollywood has produced since the golden age of Disney." Michael Phillips of the Chicago Tribune called the film "one of the few comedies of 2008 in any style or genre that knows what it's doing". However, Tom Charity of CNN criticized the action for tending "to blur into a whirlwind of slapstick chaos" and considered the character of Po too similar to others played by Black. Peter Howell of The Toronto Star awarded the film two and a half stars, considering it to have a "lack of story" that "frequently manages to amuse, if not entirely to delight".

Kung Fu Panda was also well received in China. It made nearly 110 million Yuan by July 2, 2008, becoming the first animated film to earn more than 100 million Yuan in China. The Chinese director Lu Chuan commented, "From a production standpoint, the movie is nearly perfect. Its American creators showed a very sincere attitude about Chinese culture." The film's critical and commercial success in China led to some local introspection about why no film like Kung Fu Panda had been produced in China, with commentators attributing the problem variously to lower film budgets in China, too much government oversight, a dearth of national imagination, and an overly reverent attitude to China's history and cultural icons.

Accolades 
Kung Fu Panda was nominated for the Academy Award for Best Animated Feature and the Golden Globe Award for Best Animated Feature Film, but lost both awards to Pixar's WALL-E. Jack Black joked about the film's underdog status at the 81st Academy Awards, saying "Each year, I do one DreamWorks project, then I take all the money to the Oscars and bet it on Pixar."

By contrast, Kung Fu Panda won ten Annie Awards (including Best Animated Feature) out of sixteen nominations, which sparked controversy with some accusing DreamWorks head Jeffrey Katzenberg of rigging the vote by buying ASIFA-Hollywood memberships (with voting power) for everyone at DreamWorks Animation.

Soundtrack 

As with most DreamWorks animated movies, composer Hans Zimmer scored Kung Fu Panda. Zimmer visited China to absorb the culture and got to know the Chinese National Symphony as part of his preparation; in addition, Timbaland also contributed to the soundtrack. The soundtrack also includes a partially rewritten version of the classic song, "Kung Fu Fighting", performed by Cee-Lo Green and Jack Black for the end credits. Furthermore, in some versions, the ending credit was sung by Rain. Although Zimmer was originally announced as the main composer of the film, during a test screening, CEO of DreamWorks Animation SKG Jeffrey Katzenberg announced that composer John Powell would also be contributing to the score. This marked the first collaboration in eight years for the two, who had previously worked together on DreamWorks' The Road to El Dorado and the action thriller Chill Factor. A soundtrack album was released by Interscope Records on June 3, 2008.

Spin-offs

Manga 
A manga based on the film was released in Japan in Kerokero Ace magazine's September 2008 issue. It is written by Hanten Okuma and illustrated by Takafumi Adachi.

Television series 
A television series titled Kung Fu Panda: Legends of Awesomeness aired on Nickelodeon with its premiere on September 19, 2011. From the cast of Kung Fu Panda, only Lucy Liu and James Hong reprised their roles, of Master Viper and Mr. Ping respectively. In the series, Po continues to defend the Valley of Peace from all kinds of villains, while making mistakes, learning about the history of kung-fu, and meeting other kung-fu masters. In the United States, the series ended its run on June 29, 2016, with a total of three seasons and 80 episodes. However, prior to premiering in the U.S., the final few episodes first premiered in Germany from December 30, 2014, to January 7, 2015.

Kung Fu Panda: The Paws of Destiny is an animated web-television series produced by DreamWorks Animation released for Amazon Prime on November 16, 2018. It is the second TV series in the Kung Fu Panda franchise following Kung Fu Panda: Legends of Awesomeness. Developer Mitch Watson has confirmed that Mick Wingert will reprise his role from Legends of Awesomeness as Po.

A third series, also set after Kung Fu Panda 3, titled Kung Fu Panda: The Dragon Knight, premiered on Netflix in July 2022, with Jack Black reprising his role as Po.

Holiday special 
The television holiday special, titled Kung Fu Panda Holiday, was aired on NBC Wednesday, November 24, 2010.

Video game 

A video game adaptation of the film was published by Activision on June 3, 2008. The game was released for PlayStation 3, Xbox 360, Wii, PlayStation 2, Nintendo DS and PC platforms. The plot follows the same basic plot as the film, but with Tai Lung portrayed as the leader of various gangs that surround the Valley of Peace, which Po, who possesses some basic martial art skills which can be upgraded as the game progresses, must defeat. The game was released on Microsoft Windows, as well as multiple consoles. However the Windows version has been discontinued. The game received mostly positive reviews; it scored a Metacritic rating of 76% from critics and a 7.5 out of 10 from IGN. In 2009, it won the International Animated Film Society's Annie Award for Best Animated Video Game, "in recognition of creative excellence in the art of animation."

Sequels 

The sequel, Kung Fu Panda 2, was released on May 26, 2011. It was released in 3-D and was directed by Jennifer Yuh Nelson (who directed the 2-D opening sequence of the first film) with the original cast returning. The story features a new villain with a mysterious weapon so powerful it threatens the existence of kung fu, and Po must additionally confront his past.

A third film, Kung Fu Panda 3, was released on January 29, 2016. Nelson returned to co-direct with Alessandro Carloni, and was produced in co-production with the Chinese-American studio Oriental DreamWorks.

A fourth film, Kung Fu Panda 4, is set to be released on March 8, 2024.

Literature 
 2008: Susan Korman: Kung Fu Panda - The Junior Novel (Novelization), HarperFestival,

Lawsuits 
DreamWorks Animation was sued in 2011 by a writer, Terence Dunn, for allegedly stealing the idea for Kung Fu Panda from him. Dunn alleged that DreamWorks Animation had stolen his pitch for a "spiritual kung-fu fighting panda bear" which he sent to a DreamWorks executive in 2001. DreamWorks Animation denied any wrongdoing and after a two-week trial the jurors found in favor of DreamWorks.

In 2011, another lawsuit was brought against the studio by an illustrator named Jayme Gordon. Gordon had supposedly created characters under the name "Kung Fu Panda Power" and registered them with the U.S. Copyright Office in 2000. He had allegedly pitched this concept work to Disney while Jeffrey Katzenberg, who later left Disney and formed DreamWorks Animation in 1994, was working there. Gordon withdrew his claim just before the trial was due to take place. On December 20, 2015, federal prosecutors charged Gordon with four counts of wire fraud and three counts of perjury for allegedly fabricating and backdating drawings to support the claims in his lawsuit, and for allegedly tracing some of his drawings from a coloring book featuring characters from Disney's The Lion King franchise. On November 18, 2016, Gordon was convicted for wire fraud and perjury, facing a sentence of up to 25 years in prison. In May 2017, he was sentenced to two years in federal prison and ordered to pay $3 million in restitution.

See also 
 Enter the Fat Dragon (1978)
 T'ai Fu: Wrath of the Tiger (1999)
 Legend of a Rabbit (2011)
 Shifu (or sifu), which means "skillful person" or a "master".

References

External links 

 
 
 
 

Kung Fu Panda films
2008 films
2008 animated films
2008 computer-animated films
2008 action comedy films
2000s adventure comedy films
2000s American animated films
2000s children's comedy films
2000s fantasy comedy films
2008 martial arts films
American action comedy films
American computer-animated films
Animated films about animals
Animated films about revenge
Anime-influenced Western animation
Annie Award winners
Best Animated Feature Annie Award winners
Films directed by John Stevenson
Films directed by Mark Osborne
DreamWorks Animation animated films
2000s English-language films
IMAX films
American martial arts comedy films
Films scored by Hans Zimmer
Films scored by John Powell
Films about giant pandas
Films adapted into television shows
Kung fu films
Paramount Pictures films
Paramount Pictures animated films
Wuxia films
Films set in Imperial China
Films with screenplays by Jonathan Aibel and Glenn Berger
2008 directorial debut films
2008 comedy films